Ocean fertilization or ocean nourishment is a type of technology for carbon dioxide removal from the ocean based on the purposeful introduction of plant nutrients to the upper ocean to increase marine food production and to remove carbon dioxide from the atmosphere. Ocean nutrient fertilization, for example iron fertilization, could stimulate photosynthesis in phytoplankton. The phytoplankton would convert the ocean's dissolved carbon dioxide into carbohydrate, some of which would sink into the deeper ocean before oxidizing. More than a dozen open-sea experiments confirmed that adding iron to the ocean increases photosynthesis in phytoplankton by up to 30 times.  

This is one of the more well-researched carbon dioxide removal (CDR) approaches, however this approach would only sequester carbon on a timescale of 10-100 years dependent on ocean mixing times. While surface ocean acidity may decrease as a result of nutrient fertilization, when the sinking organic matter remineralizes, deep ocean acidity will increase. A 2021 report on CDR indicates that there is medium-high confidence that the technique could be efficient and scalable at low cost, with medium environmental risks. One of the key risks of nutrient fertilization is nutrient robbing, a process by which excess nutrients used in one location for enhanced primary productivity, as in a fertilization context, are then unavailable for normal productivity downstream. This could result in ecosystem impacts far outside the original site of fertilization. 

A number of techniques, including fertilization by the micronutrient iron (called iron fertilization) or with nitrogen and phosphorus (both macronutrients), have been proposed. But research in the early 2020s suggested that it could only permanently sequester a small amount of carbon. Therefore, there is no major future in its role to sequester carbon.

Rationale 

The marine food chain is based on photosynthesis by marine phytoplankton that combine carbon with inorganic nutrients to produce organic matter. Production is limited by the availability of nutrients, most commonly nitrogen or iron. Numerous experiments have demonstrated how iron fertilization can increase phytoplankton productivity. Nitrogen is a limiting nutrient over much of the ocean and can be supplied from various sources, including fixation by cyanobacteria. Carbon-to-iron ratios in phytoplankton are much larger than carbon-to-nitrogen or carbon-to-phosphorus ratios, so iron has the highest potential for sequestration per unit mass added.

Oceanic carbon naturally cycles between the surface and the deep via two "pumps" of similar scale. The "solubility" pump is driven by ocean circulation and the solubility of CO2 in seawater. The "biological" pump is driven by phytoplankton and subsequent settling of detrital particles or dispersion of dissolved organic carbon. The former has increased as a result of increasing atmospheric CO2 concentration. This CO2 sink is estimated to be approximately 2 GtC yr−1.

The global phytoplankton population fell about 40 percent between 1950 and 2008 or about 1 percent per year. The most notable declines took place in polar waters and in the tropics. The decline is attributed to sea surface temperature increases. A separate study found that diatoms, the largest type of phytoplankton, declined more than 1 percent per year from 1998 to 2012, particularly in the North Pacific, North Indian and Equatorial Indian oceans. The decline appears to reduce pytoplankton's ability to sequester carbon in the deep ocean.

Fertilization offers the prospect of both reducing the concentration of atmospheric greenhouse gases with the aim of slowing climate change and at the same time increasing fish stocks via increasing primary production. The reduction reduces the ocean's rate of carbon sequestration in the deep ocean.

Each area of the ocean has a base sequestration rate on some timescale, e.g., annual. Fertilization must increase that rate, but must do so on a scale beyond the natural scale. Otherwise, fertilization changes the timing, but not the total amount sequestered. However, accelerated timing may have beneficial effects for primary production separate from those from sequestration.

Biomass production inherently depletes all resources (save for sun and water). Either they must all be subject to fertilization or sequestration will eventually be limited by the one mostly slowly replenished (after some number of cycles) unless the ultimate limiting resource is sunlight and/or surface area. Generally, phosphate is the ultimate limiting nutrient. As oceanic phosphorus is depleted (via sequestration) it would have to be included in the fertilization cocktail supplied from terrestrial sources.

Approaches 
"Ocean fertilisation options are only worthwhile if sustained on a millennial timescale and phosphorus addition may have greater long-term potential than iron or nitrogen fertilisation." Phytoplankton require a variety of nutrients. These include macronutrients such as nitrate and phosphate (in relatively high concentrations) and micronutrients such as iron and zinc (in much smaller quantities). Nutrient requirements vary across phylogenetic groups (e.g., diatoms require silicon) but may not individually limit total biomass production. Co-limitation (among multiple nutrients) may also mean that one nutrient can partially compensate for a shortage of another. Silicon does not affect total production, but can change the timing and community structure with follow-on effects on remineralization times and subsequent mesopelagic nutrient vertical distribution.

High-nutrient, low-chlorophyll (HNLC) waters occupy the oceans' subtropical gyre systems, approximately 40 per cent of the surface, where wind-driven downwelling and a strong thermocline impede nutrient resupply from deeper water. Nitrogen fixation by cyanobacteria provides a major source of N. In effect, it ultimately prevents the ocean from losing the N required for photosynthesis. Phosphorus has no substantial supply route, making it the ultimate limiting macronutrient. The sources that fuel primary production are deep water stocks and runoff or dust-based.

Iron

Phosphorus 
In the very long term, phosphorus "is often considered to be the ultimate limiting macronutrient in marine ecosystems" and has a slow natural cycle. Where phosphate is the limiting nutrient in the photic zone, addition of phosphate is expected to increase primary phytoplankton production. This technique can give 0.83W/m2 of globally averaged negative forcing, which is sufficient to reverse the warming effect of about half the current levels of anthropogenic  emissions. One water-soluble fertilizer is diammonium phosphate (DAP), that as of 2008 had a market price of 1700/tonne−1 of phosphorus. Using that price and the C : P Redfield ratio of 106 : 1 produces a sequestration cost (excluding preparation and injection costs) of some $45 /tonne of carbon (2008), substantially less than the trading price for carbon emissions.

Nitrogen (urea) 

This technique proposes to fertilize the ocean with urea, a nitrogen rich substance, to encourage phytoplankton growth. Concentrations of macronutrients per area of ocean surface would be similar to large natural upwellings. Once exported from the surface, the carbon remains sequestered for a long time.

An Australian company, Ocean Nourishment Corporation (ONC), planned to inject hundreds of tonnes of urea into the ocean, in order to boost the growth of -absorbing phytoplankton, as a way to combat climate change. In 2007, Sydney-based ONC completed an experiment involving one tonne of nitrogen in the Sulu Sea off the Philippines. This project was criticized by many institutions, including the European Commission, due to lack of knowledge of side effects on the marine ecosystem.

Macronutrient nourishment can give 0.38W/m2 of globally averaged negative forcing, which is sufficient to reverse the warming effect of current levels of around a quarter of anthropogenic  emissions.

The two dominant costs are manufacturing the nitrogen and nutrient delivery.

In waters with sufficient iron micro nutrients, but a deficit of nitrogen, urea fertilization is the better choice for algae growth. Urea is the most used fertilizer in the world, due to its high content of nitrogen, low cost and high reactivity towards water. When exposed to ocean waters, urea is metabolized by phytoplankton via urease enzymes to produce ammonia.

CO(NH_2)_2 + H_2O ->[urease] NH_3 + NH_2COOH 

NH_2COOH + H_2O -> NH_3 + H_2CO_3

The intermediate product carbamate also reacts with water to produce a total of two ammonia molecules. 

Another cause of concern is the sheer amount of urea needed to capture the same amount of carbon as eq. iron fertilization. The nitrogen to iron ratio in a typical algae cell is 16:0.0001, meaning that for every iron atom added to the ocean a substantial larger amount of carbon is captured compared to adding one atom of nitrogen. Scientists also emphasize that adding urea to ocean waters could reduce oxygen content and result in a rise of toxic marine algae. This could potentially have devastating effects on fish populations, which others argue would be benefiting from the urea fertilization (the argument being that fish populations would feed on healthy phytoplankton).

Pelagic pumping 
Local wave power could be used to pump nutrient-rich water from hundred- metre-plus depths to the euphotic zone. However, deep water concentrations of dissolved CO2 could be returned to the atmosphere.

The supply of DIC in upwelled water is generally sufficient for photosynthesis permitted by upwelled nutrients, without requiring atmospheric CO2. Second-order effects include how the composition of upwelled water differs from that of settling particles. More nitrogen than carbon is remineralized from sinking organic material. Upwelling of this water allows more carbon to sink than that in the upwelled water, which would make room for at least some atmospheric CO2 to be absorbed. the magnitude of this difference is unclear. No comprehensive studies have yet resolved this question. Preliminary calculations using upper limit assumptions indicate a low value. 1,000 square kilometres (390 sq mi) could sequester 1 gigatonne/year.

Sequestration thus depends on the upward flux and the rate of lateral surface mixing of the surface water with denser pumped water.

Volcanic ash 
Volcanic ash adds nutrients to the surface ocean. This is most apparent in nutrient-limited areas. Research on the effects of anthropogenic and aeolian iron addition to the ocean surface suggests that nutrient-limited areas benefit most from a combination of nutrients provided by anthropogenic, eolian and volcanic deposition. Some oceanic areas are comparably limited in more than one nutrient, so fertilization regimes that includes all limited nutrients is more likely to succeed. Volcanic ash supplies multiple nutrients to the system, but excess metal ions can be harmful. The positive impacts of volcanic ash deposition are potentially outweighed by their potential to do harm.

Clear evidence documents that ash can be as much as 45 percent by weight in some deep marine sediments. In the Pacific Ocean estimates claim that (on a millennial-scale) the atmospheric deposition of air-fall volcanic ash was as high as the deposition of desert dust. This indicates the potential of volcanic ash as a significant iron source.

In August 2008 the Kasatochi volcanic eruption in the Aleutian Islands, Alaska, deposited ash in the nutrient-limited northeast Pacific. This ash (including iron) resulted in one of the largest phytoplankton blooms observed in the subarctic. Fisheries scientists in Canada linked increased oceanic productivity from the volcanic iron to subsequent record returns of salmon in the Fraser River two years later

Monitored nutrients 
The approach advocated by Ocean Nutrition Corporation is to limit the distribution of added nutrients to allow phytoplankton concentrations to rise only to the values seen in upwelling regions (5–10 mg Chl /m3). Maintaining healthy phytoplankton levels is claimed to avoid harmful algal blooms and oxygen depletion. Chlorophyll concentration is an easily measured proxy for phytoplankton concentration. The company stated that values of approximately 4 mg Chl/m3 meet this requirement. SS

Complications 
While manipulation of the land ecosystem in support of agriculture for the benefit of humans has long been accepted (despite its side effects), directly enhancing ocean productivity has not. Among the reasons are:

Outright opposition 
According to Lisa Speer of the Natural Resources Defense Council, "There is a limited amount of money, of time, that we have to deal with this problem....The worst possible thing we could do for climate change technologies would be to invest in something that doesn't work and that has big impacts that we don't anticipate."

In 2009  Aaron Strong, Sallie Chisholm, Charles Miller and John Cullen opined in Nature "...fertilizing the oceans with iron to stimulate phytoplankton blooms, absorb carbon dioxide from the atmosphere and export carbon to the deep sea – should be abandoned."

In Science, Warren Cornwall mentions "Wil Burns, an ocean law expert at Northwestern University" who declares that "...making iron fertilization a research priority is "barking mad" since "...a recent survey of 13 past fertilization experiments found only one that increased carbon levels deep in the ocean."

Efficiency 

Algal cell chemical composition is often assumed to respect a ratio where atoms are 106 carbon: 16 nitrogen: 1 phosphorus (Redfield ratio): 0.0001 iron. In other words, each atom of iron helps capture 1,060,000 atoms of carbon, while one nitrogen atom only 6.

In large areas of the ocean, such organic growth (and hence nitrogen fixation) is thought to be limited by the lack of iron rather than nitrogen, although direct measures are hard.

On the other hand, experimental iron fertilisation in HNLC regions has been supplied with excess iron which cannot be utilized before it is scavenged. Thus the organic material produced was much less than if the ratio of nutrients above were achieved. Only a fraction of the available nitrogen (because of iron scavenging) is drawn down. In culture bottle studies of oligotrophic water, adding nitrogen and phosphorus can draw down considerably more nitrogen per dosing. The export production is only a small percentage of the new primary production and in the case of iron fertilization, iron scavenging means that regenerative production is small. With macronutrient fertilisation, regenerative production is expected to be large and supportive of larger total export. Other losses can also reduce efficiency.

In addition, the efficiency of carbon sequestration through ocean fertilisation is heavily influenced by factors such as changes in stoichiometric ratios and gas exchange make accurately predicting the effectiveness of ocean feralization projects.

Side effects 
Beyond biological impacts, evidences suggests that plankton blooms can affect the physical properties of surface waters simply by absorbing light and heat from the sun. Watson added that if fertilization is done in shallow coastal waters, a dense layer of phytoplankton clouding the top 30 metres or so of the ocean could hinder corals, kelps or other deeper sea life from carrying out photosynthesis (Watson et al. 2008). In addition, as the bloom declines, nitrous oxide is released, potentially counteracting the effects from the sequestering of carbon.

Algal blooms 
Toxic algal blooms are common in coastal areas. Fertilization could trigger such blooms. Chronic fertilization could risk the creation of dead zones, such as the one in the Gulf of Mexico.

Impact on fisheries 

Adding urea to the ocean can cause phytoplankton blooms that serve as a food source for zooplankton and in turn feed for fish. This may increase fish catches. However, if cyanobacteria and dinoflagellates dominate phytoplankton assemblages that are considered poor quality food for fish then the increase in fish quantity may not be large. Some evidence links iron fertilization from volcanic eruptions to increased fisheries production. Other nutrients would be metabolized along with the added nutrient(s), reducing their presence in fertilized waters.

Krill populations have declined dramatically since whaling began. Sperm whales transport iron from the deep ocean to the surface during prey consumption and defecation. Sperm whales have been shown to increase the levels of primary production and carbon export to the deep ocean by depositing iron-rich faeces into surface waters of the Southern Ocean. The faeces causes phytoplankton to grow and take up carbon. The phytoplankton nourish krill. Reducing the abundance of sperm whales in the Southern Ocean, whaling resulted in an extra 2 million tonnes of carbon remaining in the atmosphere each year.

Ecosystem disruption 

Many locations, such as the Tubbataha Reef in the Sulu Sea, support high marine biodiversity. Nitrogen or other nutrient loading in coral reef areas can lead to community shifts towards algal overgrowth of corals and ecosystem disruption, implying that fertilization must be restricted to areas in which vulnerable populations are not put at risk.

As the phytoplankton descend the water column, they decay, consuming oxygen and producing greenhouse gases methane and nitrous oxide. Plankton-rich surface waters could warm the surface layer, affecting circulation patterns.

Cloud formation 
Many phytoplankton species release dimethyl sulfide (DMS), which escapes into the atmosphere where it forms sulfate aerosols and encourages cloud formation, which could reduce warming. However, substantial increases in DMS could reduce global rainfall, according to global climate model simulations, while halving temperature increases as of 2100.

Reactions 
In 2007 Working Group III of the United Nations Intergovernmental Panel on Climate Change examined ocean fertilization methods in its fourth assessment report and noted that the field-study estimates of the amount of carbon removed per ton of iron was probably over-estimated and that potential adverse effects had not been fully studied.

In June 2007 the London Dumping Convention issued a statement of concern noting 'the potential for large scale ocean iron fertilization to have negative impacts on the marine environment and human health', but did not define 'large scale'. It is believed that the definition would include operations.

In 2008, the London Convention/London Protocol noted in resolution LC-LP.1 that knowledge on the effectiveness and potential environmental impacts of ocean fertilization was insufficient to justify activities other than research. This non-binding resolution stated that fertilization, other than research, "should be considered as contrary to the aims of the Convention and Protocol and do not currently qualify for any exemption from the definition of dumping".

In May 2008, at the Convention on Biological Diversity, 191 nations called for a ban on ocean fertilization until scientists better understand the implications.

In August 2018, Germany banned the sale of ocean seeding as carbon sequestration system while the matter was under discussion at EU and EASAC levels.

International Law 

International law presents some dilemmas for ocean fertilization. The United Nations Framework Convention on Climate Change (UNFCCC 1992) has accepted mitigation actions. However, the UNFCCC and its revisions recognise only afforestation and reforestation projects as carbon sinks.

Law of the sea 

According to United Nations Convention on the Law of the Sea (LOSC 1982), all states are obliged to take all measures necessary to prevent, reduce and control pollution of the marine environment, to prohibit the transfer of damage or hazards from one area to another and to prohibit the transformation of one type pollution to another. How this relates to fertilization is undetermined.

Solar radiation management 

Fertilization may create sulfate aerosols that reflect sunlight, modifying the Earth's albedo, creating a cooling effect that reduces some of the effects of climate change. Enhancing the natural sulfur cycle in the Southern Ocean by fertilizing with iron in order to enhance dimethyl sulfide production and cloud reflectivity may achieve this.

See also 

 Carbon dioxide sink
 Climate engineering
 Effects of climate change on oceans
 Iron fertilization
 Planetary engineering
 Soil fertilization

References

External links 
  
  

Aquatic ecology
Fisheries science
Planetary engineering
Articles containing video clips
Oceanographical terminology
Climate engineering
Carbon dioxide removal

de:Eisendüngung